Sree Narayana Polytechnic College (Malayalam: ശ്രീ നാരായണ പോളിടെക് നിക്ക് (SNPTC) is located in Kottiyam near Kollam, Kerala in southern India. It is named after the Saint and social reformer "Sree Narayana Guru". SNPTC was founded in 1957, by the Sree Narayana Trusts, Kollam under the initiative of the secretary, the late Sri.R.Sankar, former chief minister of Kerala. In the period 2006–07, the college celebrated its Golden Jubilee.

The college is known for its student festivals: arts festival, sports meet, union inauguration, women's day festival and poly day.

Information
SN Polytechnic is a nodal polytechnic in Kollam district. SNPTC was founded by the late R.Sankar, a visionary and social reformer who had built up and nourished several institutions. It is a technical institute, approved by the All India Council of Technical Education (AICTE) and is located in a 15-acre campus at Kottiyam, 12 km from the Kollam city. The college is located close to the Holy Cross Hospital. The college has more than 50 faculty and 750 students. The governing body of the college is constituted by the Kerala Board of Technical Education is chaired by S.N Trust.

Departments

The college started functioning with three courses: Mechanical Engineering (70 seats), Civil Engineering (70 seats) and Electrical Engineering (70 seats). In 2000 it started Electronics Engineering (30 seats). The polytechnic curriculum was revised and semesterised in the 2006–07 academic year.

Certificate courses
The Continuing Education Cell of the Canada India Institutional (CIICP) Co-operation Project was set up in 1996. It has been conducting the job oriented courses like JCB, Crane, Forklift operators and X-ray welding.
 
Community Polytechnic Scheme sponsored by Ministry of Human Resources Development, government of India functions in SNPTC providing self-employment opportunities to the unemployed youth by providing proper training through different centers free of cost.

The Indian Society for Technical Education (ISTE) Students Chapter started at SNPTC in 2000. ISTE is a professional society of educators and administrators in technology, dedicated to the maintenance of quality and standards.

Facilities
SNPTC has the following facilities: 
 Main Building.
 Workshops
 Department Labs
 Central Library
 Co-operative society 
 Hostels
 Play Ground 
 Canteen under the guidance of Kudumbasree unit.

Extracurricular activities
Two NSS units (104,105 units) of the college involve in developmental as well as service activities.

NCC unit is attached to 3(k) girl's Battalion N.C.C, Kollam. Unit strength is 52 cadets with six girls' cadets, and their activities are coordinated by an officer.

The placement cell in association with Reliance Communications Ltd had conducted "carrier mela" on 7-7-2007. More than 400 students participated in the carrier mela and about 80 persons got selected for appointment.
 
PTA of SNPTC provides funds for engaging guest faculty to overcome the shortage of staff, for purchasing lab materials and stationery for students.

The Alumni Association keeps contact between passed-out students and the college. It helps students by sharing knowledge and introducing job opportunities. About 95% of passed-out students are placed in organizations through campus selection. The rest opt for higher studies. The cine artist Biju Pappan is an alumnus.

The students participate in the inter-polytechnic games, inter-collegiate debate and youth festival. The staff and students co-operate with the Chathayam day celebration, Founder's day (death anniversary of Shri.R.Sankar) and Navarathri Festival at Sarada Mutt, Kollam. An annual magazine is published.

Kerala State Polytechnic College Arts festival 2012-2013 held in Kollam was hosted by Sree Narayana Polytechnic College. The college and Government Polytechnic College, Palakkad, were the joint winners of Kalolsavam 2012–13.

Notable alumni
 Biju Pappan, Actor Malayalam film Industry

References

External links
Official website
Directorate of Technical Education
Sree Narayana Trusts Educational Institutions

Narayana Guru
Engineering colleges in Kollam
Sree Narayana College, Kollam
Educational institutions established in 1957
1957 establishments in India